Red Head is an unincorporated community in Washington County, Florida, United States. It is located along State Road 79 north of Ebro, and is the home of a local airstrip named Red Head Airport.

References

Unincorporated communities in Washington County, Florida
Unincorporated communities in Florida